Hartmut Briesenick (17 March 1949 in Luckenwalde, Brandenburg – 8 March 2013) was an East German athlete who mainly competed in the men's shot put event.

Briesenick competed for East Germany at the 1972 Summer Olympics held in Munich, Germany where he won the bronze medal in the men's shot put event. His first marriage was with volleyball player Marion Riebel. He was then married to Ilona Slupianek, a fellow German shot-putter, from 1984 until they divorced before his death. He had a daughter with Slupianek.

References

External links
European Championships

1949 births
2013 deaths
Sportspeople from Luckenwalde
East German male shot putters
German male shot putters
Olympic bronze medalists for East Germany
Athletes (track and field) at the 1972 Summer Olympics
Olympic athletes of East Germany
European Athletics Championships medalists
Medalists at the 1972 Summer Olympics
Olympic bronze medalists in athletics (track and field)
Universiade medalists in athletics (track and field)
Recipients of the Patriotic Order of Merit in bronze
Universiade gold medalists for East Germany
Medalists at the 1970 Summer Universiade